Little Songs may refer to:

Books
Little Songs, a publication of poems by Marjorie Pickthall

Music

Classical
Little Songs, by John J. Becker
Three Little Songs, a work by Igor Stravinsky
5 Little Songs, a composition by Reynaldo Hahn

Albums
Little Songs (David Usher album), 1998
Little Songs (Jon Guerra album), 2015
Little Songs, a children's album in Iran by Hengameh Mofid

Songs
"Little Songs", song by The Microphones on the album Tests